Gregory Lemont Ellis (born August 14, 1975) is a former football defensive end who played in the National Football League (NFL) for twelve seasons. He played college football for the University of North Carolina, and was recognized as an All-American. He was drafted by the Dallas Cowboys in the first round of the 1998 NFL Draft, and also played a season for the Oakland Raiders. Ellis has also produced for television and film, including as the executive producer of the 2015 sports film Carter High.

Early years
Ellis was born in Wendell, North Carolina. He attended East Wake High School in Wendell. He was named Male High School Athlete of the Year in 1993 by the Raleigh News and Observer.

College career
Ellis attended the University of North Carolina, and played for the North Carolina Tar Heels football team from 1994 to 1997. Ellis had four sacks a back-up defensive end during his redshirt freshman year. In 1995, he was named first-team All-ACC. Ellis was also named honorable mention All-American by UPI, while recording 71 tackles and seven sacks.  As a junior, Ellis was named second-team All-American by The Sporting News and was a first-team All-ACC selection after closing the season with 62 tackles and 12.5 sacks—the second most sacks in Tar Heels history, behind Lawrence Taylor's 16 in 1979.

Professional career

Dallas Cowboys

Ellis was drafted with the 8th pick of first round in the 1998 NFL Draft by the Dallas Cowboys, a selection which caused a great stir among Dallas Cowboys fans who were disappointed that the team passed on the opportunity to take Randy Moss. Although rumored to be the destination where Moss would end up, Dallas opted to take a player in Ellis who did not possess the character issues that Moss did.

He became a starter at defensive end for Dallas immediately and started 155 of 162 games during his Cowboy career from 1998-2008. For the first eight years he spent a similar amount of time as the starting right end as he did the starting left end. In 2006, he was moved to outside linebacker as Bill Parcells implemented his 3-4 defense. Ellis started 35 games and made 38 total appearances at outside linebacker from 2006-2008.

During his tenure in Dallas he totaled 77 quarterback sacks, 377 tackles, 20 forced fumbles nine fumble recoveries and four interceptions. He scored two touchdowns, both in 1999, one coming on an 87-yard interception return and the other on a 98-yard return of a fumble recovery.

Ellis's top season in quarterback sacks was 2007 when he tallied 12.5 sacks in only 13 games. Other top sack seasons were 2004 (9.0), 2003 and 2005 (8.0 each) and 1999 and 2002 (7.5 each). In 2007 Ellis was selected for the NFC Pro Bowl roster and was named the NFL Comeback Player of the Year, acknowledging his return from a season-ending Achilles tendon suffered during the 2006 campaign.

The Cowboys decided to release Ellis on June 2, 2009, saving $4.15 million in cap space.

Oakland Raiders
Ellis agreed on a 3-year contract for $10 million with the Oakland Raiders on June 15, 2009. In Oakland, Ellis returned to the position of defensive end in a 4-3 scheme. Ellis joined a Raiders line that would also include former Patriot and all-pro Richard Seymour.

Ellis started all 14 games he appeared in for the Raiders in 2009 at right defensive end. He amassed seven quarterback sacks, 26 tackles, two forced fumbles and two fumble recoveries. He was released on March 8, 2010.

NFL career statistics

Regular season

College Coaching 
In 2020, he reconnected with football to become the head football coach at Texas College, a Historically Black College and University (HBCU) and NAIA school, located in Tyler, Texas. The 2020 season was canceled due to COVID-19, starting his first coaching season in 2021. During the 2021 football season the team lost every game having a 0-10 record. On March 31, 2022 it was announced Ellis would be leaving Texas College. In June of 2022, Ellis was hired as the head football coach at Southwestern Assemblies of God University in Waxahachie, Texas, a conference opponent of Texas College.

Personal life
While attending East Wake High School, he met his wife, Tangie Ellis. They have three children together: Tyann, Geremiah and Taliah.

References

External links
 Dallas Cowboys bio
 

1975 births
Living people
All-American college football players
American football defensive ends
American football linebackers
Dallas Cowboys players
National Conference Pro Bowl players
North Carolina Tar Heels football players
Oakland Raiders players
People from Wendell, North Carolina
Players of American football from North Carolina
Ed Block Courage Award recipients